Miyankuh-e Sharqi Rural District is a rural district (dehestan) in Mamulan District, Pol-e Dokhtar County, Lorestan Province, Iran. At the 2006 census, its population was 4,907, in 1,038 families.  The rural district has 44 villages.

References 

Rural Districts of Lorestan Province
Pol-e Dokhtar County